Richard le Gras (Richard the Bold in French; died 9 December 1242) was Lord Keeper of England and Abbot of Evesham in the 13th century.

Richard was prior of Hurley Priory before his election as abbot on 25 September 1236. He was blessed by the Bishop of Coventry on 30 November 1236 and was installed in office on 6 December 1236.

Richard was Lord Keeper from 1240 to 1242.

Richard was elected Bishop of Coventry in 1241, but either did not accept the office or died before the disputed election was resolved. He died in Gascony on 9 December 1242.

Citations

References

See also

 List of Lord Chancellors and Lord Keepers

Lord chancellors of England
English abbots
Year of birth missing
1242 deaths